Sophie Mathiou (born 5 February 2002 in Aosta) is an Italian alpine skier, competing in almost all disciplines, with a focus in slalom, in which she has won the 2021 world junior title.

Mathiou made her World Cup debut in March 2021 at age 19. She lives in Gressan, Aosta Valley.

Two Alpine skiers from her family have previously participated in world-class competitions: her grandmother Roselda Joux (born 1950) and her aunt Sonia Viérin (born 1977).

References

External links
 

2002 births
Living people
Italian female alpine skiers
Alpine skiers at the 2020 Winter Youth Olympics
People from Aosta
Alpine skiers of Centro Sportivo Carabinieri
Sportspeople from Aosta Valley